Thorborg is a surname. Notable people with the surname include:

Helle Thorborg (born 1927), Danish painter and graphic designer
Karin Thorborg (born 1948), Swedish politician
Kerstin Thorborg (1896–1970), Swedish opera singer
Niels Thorborg (born 1964), Danish football chairman
Søren Thorborg (1889–1978), Danish gymnast